Anren may refer to any of the following places in China:

 Anren County, Chenzhou, Hunan province
 Anren, Shandong a town of Yucheng, Dezhou, Shandong
 Anren, Dayi, a town of Dayi County, Chengdu, Sichuan